is a Japanese politician serving in the House of Representatives in the Diet (national legislature) as a member of the Liberal Democratic Party. A native of Nagasaki and high school graduate he was elected to the Diet for the first time in 2005 after serving in the assembly in Nagasaki Prefecture from 1999 to 2003.

References

External links
 Official website in Japanese.

Living people
1963 births
Liberal Democratic Party (Japan) politicians
Members of the House of Representatives (Japan)
21st-century Japanese politicians